Sandhofen is a northern borough (Stadtbezirk) of Mannheim, Baden-Württemberg, Germany. The US Army is present in Sandhofen with Coleman Airfield and Coleman Barracks. The US Army's only military prison in Europe is located on that base. All US Army helicopter maintenance for Europe and the Middle East is performed at Coleman.

References

External links 

 Official website (in German)

Mannheim